The church of San Leonardo da Porto Maurizio ad Acilia is a church in Rome located at Acilia District, dedicated to Leonard of Port Maurice.

Pope Francis instituted this church as a seat of the cardinal title of S. Leonardo da Porto Maurizio.

List of Cardinal Protectors
 Sebastian Koto Khoarai 19 November 2016 - 17 April 2021
 Leonardo Ulrich Steiner 27 August 2022 - present

References

External links
 San Leonardo 

Titular churches
Rome Q. XXVII Primavalle